The name Abu al-Qasim or Abu'l-Qasim, meaning father of Qasim, is a kunya or attributive name of Islamic prophet Muhammad, describing him as father to his son Qasim ibn Muhammad. Since then the name has been used by the following:

People
Al-Mustakfi, also known as Abu al-Qasim Abdallah was the Caliph of Baghdad from September 944 to 946.
Al-Muti, also known as Abu al-Qasim al-Fadl was the Caliph of Baghdad from 28 January 946 to 5 August 974.
Al-Muqtadi also known as Abu al-Qasim Abdallah was the Caliph of Baghdad from 2 April 1075 to 3 February 1094.
Ali ibn al-Hasan al-Kalbi (died 982), Kalbid emir of Sicily
Abu al-Qasim Kashani (died after 1324), Persian historian active in the late Ilkhanate era
Mohamed Abu al-Qasim al-Zwai (born 1952), Secretary General of Libya's General People's Congress
Amal Abul-Qassem Donqol (1940–1983), Egyptian poet
Aboul-Qacem Echebbi (1909–1934), Tunisian poet
Abu'l-Qásim Faizi (1906–1980), Persian Bahá'í
Abu al-Qasim al-Khoei (1899–1992), Twelver Shi'a Islamic grand ayatollah (marja)
Abolqasem Najm (1892–1981), Iranian politician, cabinet minister, and diplomat
Abolqasem Lahouti (1887–1957), Persian poet
Abol-Ghasem Kashani (1882–1962), Iranian Twelver Shi'a Muslim cleric
Abul Kasem Fazlul Huq (1873—1962), Bengali politician
Abu al-Qasim al-Zayyani (1734/35–1833), Berber historian, geographer, poet and statesman from Morocco
At-Tayyib Abu'l-Qasim (twelfth century), Fatimid Imām
Abu-l-Qasim Ahmad ibn al-Husayn ibn Qasi (died 1151), leader of the opposition against the Almoravid dynasty in Al-Garb Al-Andalus
Abu Al-Qasim Mahmud Ibn 'Umar Al-Zamakhshari (1074 or 1075–1143 or 1144), Muslim scholar
 Abu'l-Qasim ibn Hammud ibn al-Hajar (fl. 1167-1185), leader of the Sicilian Muslim community, Norman Kingdom of Sicily
Abu'l-Qasim (Seljuq governor of Nicaea) (ruled 1084–1092)
Abu al-Qasim Muhammad ibn Abbad (ruled 1023–1042), founder and eponym of the Abbadid dynasty in Al-Andalus
Abu al-Qasim Ferdowsi (940–1020), Persian poet
Abu al-Qasim al-Zahrawi (936–1013), or Abulcasis, Arab surgeon and physician who lived in Al-Andalus
Abu Al-Qasim Al-Ansari (1040-1118), Islamic theologian who lived in Transoxiana.
Abolghasem Alidoust, Iranian legal scholar
Abol-Ghasem Kashani (1882–1962), Iranian politician and ayatollah
Abolghasem Khazali (1925–2015), Iranian politician and cleric
Abolghasem Mozaffari (born 1967), Iranian military person
Abolghasem Orouji (born 1989), Iranian futsal player
Abolghasem Sakhdari ( 1948), Iranian wrestler
Abolghasem Sarhaddizadeh (1945–2020), Iranian politician
Abolghasem Wafi Yazdi (born 1935), Iranian Shia cleric
Abu Kasim Adamu, Nigeria botanist and academics professor
Abou Kassim Khemila (born 2000), Tunisian National Engineer in Topography, Geomatics and Remote sensing
Abul Qasim al-Nasarabadi, Sufi wali (saint) who received his path from Abu Bakr al-Shibli and gave it to Abu Ali Dakkak

Places
Abul Kasim (mountain), mountain in Ethiopia
Abulkasym Madrassah, building in Tashkent, Uzbekistan

Arabic masculine given names